Antonio Tomás González (born 19 January 1985) is a Spanish professional footballer who plays as a defensive midfielder for Racing de Santander.

Football career
Tomás was born in Torrelavega, Cantabria. He came through the youth ranks at local giants Racing de Santander, making his La Liga debut on 30 October 2005 by starting in a 1–1 away draw against Valencia CF and finishing the season with 23 first-team appearances.

In 2006, Tomás was signed by Deportivo de La Coruña and immediately loaned to his former team for one year, returning for the 2007–08 campaign and playing sparingly as Depor finished ninth. From 2009 to 2011 he was regularly used by manager Miguel Ángel Lotina – only three of his 51 league appearances were not starts– but the Galicians eventually suffered relegation in the second season, and he was subsequently released.

On 27 September 2011, Tomás joined Real Zaragoza in a season-long deal. On 20 February of the following year, however, he terminated his contract with the Aragonese and, four days later, signed for 16 months with Bulgarian club PFC CSKA Sofia.

Tomás returned to his country for 2012–13, going on to appear in four Segunda División campaigns with CD Numancia and feature regularly in three of those. On 17 July 2016, he signed for one year with Superleague Greece club Veria F.C. for an undisclosed fee.

Club statistics

References

External links

1985 births
Living people
People from Torrelavega
Spanish footballers
Footballers from Cantabria
Association football midfielders
La Liga players
Segunda División players
Segunda División B players
Tercera División players
Rayo Cantabria players
Racing de Santander players
Deportivo de La Coruña players
Real Zaragoza players
CD Numancia players
First Professional Football League (Bulgaria) players
PFC CSKA Sofia players
Super League Greece players
Veria F.C. players
Spanish expatriate footballers
Expatriate footballers in Bulgaria
Expatriate footballers in Greece